Maxime Chevalier (born 16 May 1999) is a French cyclist, who currently rides for French amateur team Laval Cyclisme 53. In August 2020, he was named in the startlist for the 2020 Tour de France.

Major results
2019
 4th Overall Giro della Valle d'Aosta
 4th Paris–Tours Espoirs
 8th Overall Tour du Jura
2021 
 1st Prologue Tour de Savoie Mont-Blanc
 7th Trofeo Andratx – Mirador d’Es Colomer

Grand Tour general classification results timeline

References

External links

1999 births
Living people
French male cyclists
Sportspeople from Saint-Nazaire
Cyclists from Loire-Atlantique